Chain of Lakes Park is a baseball field in Winter Haven, Florida. The stadium was built in 1966 and holds 7,000 people. It was the spring training home of the Boston Red Sox from 1966 to 1992, after which the Red Sox moved operations to City of Palms Park in Fort Myers.

In 1993, the Cleveland Indians moved into Chain of Lakes Park after their own stadium in Homestead was destroyed by Hurricane Andrew. The stadium served as Cleveland's spring training home until their last game on March 27, 2008. Cleveland moved their spring training operations to Goodyear Ballpark in Goodyear, Arizona in 2009.

The future of the ballpark and facility is in doubt; its location on Lake Lulu has become valuable for commercial and residential development. In 2011, developers proposed a multipurpose redevelopment of the site, including hotels, restaurants, shops, and a movie theater.

References

External links

 Ball Parks of the Minor Leagues: Chain of Lakes Park

Buildings and structures in Winter Haven, Florida
Minor league baseball venues
Grapefruit League venues
Boston Red Sox spring training venues
Cleveland Indians spring training venues
1966 establishments in Florida
Sports venues completed in 1966
Cross country running courses in Florida